The 2020 Pan American Judo Championships was a judo event which took place in Guadalajara, Mexico, from 19 to 22 November 2020. The championships were originally scheduled to be held in Montreal, Canada, from 17 to 19 April 2020, but were postponed due to the COVID-19 pandemic.

Medal table

Results

Men's events

Women's events 

Only four competitors took part in the +78 kg event, so only one bronze was awarded

Mixed event

References

External links
 
 Pan American Judo Confederation

2020
American Championships
International sports competitions hosted by Mexico
Pan American Judo Championships
Pan American Judo Championships
Sports events postponed due to the COVID-19 pandemic